Beerwah railway station is a heritage-listed railway station on the North Coast line in Queensland, Australia. It serves the town of Beerwah in the Sunshine Coast Region. It is listed on the Sunshine Coast Region Heritage Register.

History
Due to white-ant damage to the old building, the station underwent a major facelift with construction of a new station office, waiting shelters, bus shelters and carpark.

Services
Beerwah is serviced by City network services to Brisbane, Nambour and Gympie North. To relieve congestion on the single track North Coast line, the rail service is supplemented by a bus service operated by Kangaroo Bus Lines on weekdays between Caboolture and Nambour as route 649.

Services by platform

Future
Beerwah is the proposed junction for the Maroochydore railway line outlined under the South East Queensland Infrastructure Plan and Program. The North Coast line from Beerburrum to Landsborough is scheduled to be duplicated by 2021.

References

External links

Beerwah station Queensland Rail
Beerwah station Queensland's Railways on the Internet

North Coast railway line, Queensland
Railway stations in Sunshine Coast, Queensland